DNA-directed RNA polymerases I, II, and III subunit RPABC2 is a protein that in humans is encoded by the POLR2F gene.

This gene encodes the sixth largest subunit of RNA polymerase II, the polymerase responsible for synthesizing messenger RNA in eukaryotes, that is also shared by the other two DNA-directed RNA polymerases. In yeast, this polymerase subunit, in combination with at least two other subunits, forms a structure that stabilizes the transcribing polymerase on the DNA template.

Interactions
POLR2F has been shown to interact with POLR2C.

See also
 RNA polymerase II

References

Further reading